David B. Haley (born October 29, 1958) is a Democratic member of the Kansas Senate, representing the 4th district since 2001. From 1995 to 2001, he was a Kansas Representative. He ran unsuccessfully for Kansas Secretary of State in 2002 and 2006.

He is the son of politician George W. Haley and nephew of Pulitzer Prize winner Alex Haley.

Issue positions
Where David Haley stands on some of the issues (according to his website):
 Fiscally conservative
 Stronger penalties for animal cruelty
 Campaign finance reform

See also: Sen. Haley on the issues from Project Vote Smart

Committee assignments
In addition to being a member of the Kansas Sentencing Commission, Haley serves on these legislative committees:
 Judiciary
 Public Health and Welfare
 Joint Committee on Children's Issues
 Joint Committee on Corrections and Juvenile Justice Oversight
 Joint Committee on Health Policy Oversight
 Joint Committee on State-Tribal Relations

Sponsored legislation
In 2010 Haley's proposed legislation included:
 Two bills relating to crime and punishment
 A bill requiring a paper trail for electronic voting
 A bill proposing the President be elected by popular vote
 A bill to abolish the death penalty, which died after a 20-20 tied vote in the Senate in 2010.

Major donors
The top contributors to Haley's 2008 campaign, according to OpenSecrets:
Senate Democratic Committee of Kansas, Kansas Trial Lawyers Association, Kansans for Lifesaving Cures, Pipefitters Local Union 533, Deffenbaugh Industries, Democratic Senatorial Campaign Committee of Kansas, Kansas Contractors Association, Carpenters District Council of Kansas City

His largest donor groups were from energy/natural resources companies and political parties.

References

External links
Kansas State Senate Website
Project Vote Smart Bio
 Campaign Contributions: 2008, 2006, 2004, 2002, 2000, 1998, 1996

African-American state legislators in Kansas
Democratic Party Kansas state senators
Democratic Party members of the Kansas House of Representatives
Politicians from Kansas City, Kansas
1958 births
Living people
21st-century American politicians
20th-century American politicians
Morehouse College alumni
Howard University alumni
20th-century African-American politicians
African-American men in politics
21st-century African-American politicians